Cheng Chang-hsiung is a Taiwanese politician. He currently serves as the Administrative Deputy Minister of the Coast Guard Administration of the Executive Yuan.

CGA Deputy Ministry

Cross-strait joint sea rescue exercise
In September 2010, Yu, along with Xu Zuyuan, Vice Minister of Transport of the PRC, joint commanded the first joint sea rescue exercise between Taiwan and Mainland China. The exercise lasted for more than an hour and was held on 6 km2 of water near the narrow passage between Kinmen and Xiamen.

References

Government ministers of Taiwan
Living people
Year of birth missing (living people)